Wiklund is a Swedish surname. It may refer to:

 Adolf Wiklund (musician) (1879–1950), Swedish composer and conductor
 Anders Wiklund (b. 1949), Swedish Left Party politician
 Elis Wiklund (1909–1982), Swedish cross-country skier
 Emma Wiklund (b. 1968), Swedish fashion model and actress
 Gustav Wiklund (b. 1934), Finnish actor and writer
 Hans Wiklund (b. 1964), Swedish journalist, movie critic and TV-show host
 Ragne Wiklund (b. 2000), Norwegian speed skater